Zach Jackson (born August 13, 1997) is an American professional basketball player for the Leicester Riders of the British Basketball League.

Early life
Jackson was born in Wichita, Kansas.

College career
As a sophomore at Omaha, Jackson averaged 10.8 points per game. Jackson averaged 17.6 points, 6.4 rebounds, and 0.9 assists per game. As a senior, Jackson averaged 18.1 points, 4.3 rebounds, 1.9 assists and 0.8 steals per game. He was named to the first-team All-Summit League and the ABC All-District 12 First Team.

Professional career
In September 2019, Jackson signed with Kharkivski Sokoly of the Ukrainian Basketball Superleague. On August 19, 2020, Jackson signed with the Leicester Riders of the British Basketball League.

Career statistics

References

External links
Omaha Mavericks bio

1997 births
Living people
American expatriate basketball people in Ukraine
American expatriate basketball people in the United Kingdom
American men's basketball players
Basketball players from Wichita, Kansas
Leicester Riders players
Omaha Mavericks men's basketball players
Shooting guards
BC Kharkivski Sokoly players